TheWorks.co.uk PLC, trading as The Works, is a discount retailer based in the United Kingdom selling an extensive range of books, art and craft materials, gifts, toys, games and stationery.

History
The company was founded in 1981 by Mike and Jenny Crossley as discount bookstore Remainders Limited. The Works stores are categorised into five product "zones": Kids (toys, games etc.), Arts and Craft, Stationery, Family Gifts, and Seasonal/Regional, which includes a selection of local interest and tourist-specific ranges. TheWorks.co.uk, the company's first e-commerce platform, was launched in January 2012.

The company's loyalty card scheme, 'Together', was launched in 2013, and had reached one million members by the end of 2016.

Expansion and ownership
The Works acquired 26 outlets of the Bargain Books and Bookworld chains in 2007 after their parent company went into administration. The Works itself entered administration in January 2008. The business was subsequently purchased by the private equity firm Endless in May 2008. Hoyle became chairman of the discount retailer after the "sizeable cash investment" in July 2015.

It was announced in July 2018 that The Works, approximately one-third owned by Hoyle, would have an initial public offering and a valuation of £100 million. Hoyle retained the largest shareholding of 15% after the flotation.

See also
 Books in the United Kingdom

References

Arts and crafts retailers
Bookshops of the United Kingdom
Retail companies established in 1981
Retail companies of the United Kingdom
2018 initial public offerings